Shadow Music is the fifth rock album by British instrumental (and sometimes vocal) group The Shadows, released in 1966 through EMI Records.

Track listing

Personnel 
Hank Marvin - Main song instrument player
Bruce Welch - Rhythm guitar and vocals
Brian Bennett - Drums, percussion and piano
John Rostill - Bass guitar and vocals
Norrie Paramor - Producer, piano and orchestral accompaniment on "A Sigh (Un Sospiro)"
Dave Steen - photography

Charts

References 

1966 albums
The Shadows albums
EMI Columbia Records albums
Albums produced by Norrie Paramor